Shawn Evans may refer to:

 Shawn Evans (ice hockey) (born 1965), former ice hockey player and current head coach
 Shawn Evans (lacrosse) (born 1986), Canadian lacrosse player

See also
Shaun Evans (disambiguation)
Sean Evans (disambiguation)